Repeal of alcohol prohibition may refer to:

 Repeals in the various Canadian provinces, Prohibition in Canada § Repeal
 Repeal in the United States, accomplished by the Twenty-first Amendment to the United States Constitution.